The Symphony No. 4, Op. 49, is an orchestral composition by the Finnish composer Aulis Sallinen, who wrote the piece from 1978–79 for a commission from the City of Turku, to celebrate its 750th anniversary. The Turku Philharmonic Orchestra premiered the work on 9 August 1979, under the direction of its principal conductor, Pertti Pekkanen.

Structure 
The symphony is in three movements:

Instrumentation 
According to the publisher, Novello & Co, Symphony No. 4 is scored for the following:
Woodwind: 3 flutes (2 doubling piccolo), 3 oboes, 3 clarinets in B (1 doubling B bass clarinet), 3 bassoons (1 doubling contrabassoon)
Brass: 4 horns in F, 3 trumpets in B, 3 trombones, 1 tuba
Percussion: timpani, 3 percussionists (individual instruments?)
Strings: violins, violas, cellos, double basses, harp, celesta

Recordings 
To date, Symphony No. 4 has received three recordings, the first of which is from 1984 with Okko Kamu conducting the Helsinki Philharmonic on the Finlandia label. Finnish conductor Ari Rasilainen has also recorded the symphony as part of cpo's compendium of Sallinen's orchestral works. The Fourth Symphony joins the Second (Op. 29, 1972), the Horn Concerto (Op. 82, 2002), and Mauermusik (Op. 7, 1963) on the third volume of the cpo series.

Notes, references, and sources

Notes

References

Sources 

Books

CD liner notes

Journal articles
 
 

Symphonies by Aulis Sallinen
1979 compositions
Sallinen 4